is a railway station located in the town of Mamurogawa, Yamagata Prefecture, Japan, operated by the East Japan Railway Company (|JR East).

Lines
Mamurogawa Station is served by the Ōu Main Line, and is located 164.0 rail kilometers from the terminus of the line at Fukushima Station.

Station layout
The  station has one side platform and one island platform, connected by a footbridge. The station is staffed.

Platforms

History
It was renamed to its present name on September 20, 1916. The JGR became the Japan National Railways (JNR) after World War II. The station was absorbed into the JR East network upon the privatization of the JNR on April 1, 1987. A new station building was completed in December 2003.

Passenger statistics
In fiscal 2018, the station was used by an average of 118 passengers daily (boarding passengers only).

Surrounding area
Japan National Route 344
Mamorugawa Post Office
ruins of Sakenobe Castle

See also
List of railway stations in Japan

References

External links

 JR East Station information 

Stations of East Japan Railway Company
Railway stations in Yamagata Prefecture
Ōu Main Line
Railway stations in Japan opened in 1904
Mamurogawa, Yamagata